Solomon Owusu (born 28 October 1995) is a Norwegian professional footballer who plays as a defender or midfielder.

External links
 Fotball.no
 

1995 births
Living people
Footballers from Accra
Ghanaian footballers
Norwegian footballers
Association football defenders
Association football midfielders
Eliteserien players
Follo FK players
Raufoss IL players
Odds BK players